Kanungu Power Station is a  run-of-the-river hydroelectric power station on the Ishasha River in Uganda. The station is sometimes referred to as the Ishasha Power Station.

Location
The geographical coordinates of the power station are: 0°52'53.0"S, 29°40'14.0"E (Latitude:-0.881389; Longitude:29.670556). 

A tailrace then takes water from the power station and returns it to the Ishasha River. Provision has been made for an open-pipe flow of 250 liters per second into the section of the river between the dam and the tailrace to ensure that local fish species are not adversely affected. A , 33 kiloVolt transmission line connects the power station to the national grid.

History
The power station was constructed by Eco Power Uganda Limited, a subsidiary of Eco Power Holdings Limited of Sri Lanka. Construction was completed in March 2011. The power plant was technically commissioned on 18 March 2011. Political commissioning was performed on 22 November 2011. The plant is expected to support development of industries and stimulate other areas of investment in Kanungu and the surrounding rural areas, including parts of the neighboring Democratic Republic of the Congo.

Construction costs
The estimated cost of the dam and power plant is approximately UGX:40 billion (about US$14 million). Funding was provided by three Sri Lankan financial institutions: National Development Bank of Sri Lanka, Hatton National Bank, and  Commercial Bank of Sri Lanka.

See also
List of power stations in Uganda

References

External links
 Uganda: East Africa’s hydro powerhouse As at 10 March 2017.
 Completed Kanungu Dam and Power Plant

Dams completed in 2011
Energy infrastructure completed in 2011
Dams in Uganda
Hydroelectric power stations in Uganda
Kanungu District